PSB-10 is a drug which acts as a selective antagonist for the adenosine A3 receptor (ki value at human A3 receptor is 0.44 nM), with high selectivity over the other three adenosine receptor subtypes (ki values at human A1, A2A and A2B receptors are 4.1, 3.3 and 30 μM). Further pharmacological experiments in a [35S]GTPγS binding assay using hA3-CHO-cells indicated that PSB-10 acts as an inverse agonist (IC50 = 4 nM). It has been shown to produce antiinflammatory effects in animal studies. Simple xanthine derivatives such as caffeine and DPCPX have generally low affinity for the A3 subtype and must be extended by expanding the ring system and adding an aromatic group to give high A3 affinity and selectivity. The affinity towards adenosine A3 subtype was measured against the radioligand PSB-11.

References

Chlorobenzenes
Purines
Lactams
Adenosine receptor antagonists